A jumping jack is a physical exercise, also known as a star jump in the UK.

Jumping jack may refer to:
 Jumping jack (toy), a toy with an attached string
 Jumping Jack (video game), 1983, also released as Leggit!
 Jumping Jack, 1984, released by Universal Entertainment Corporation
 Jack jumper ant, a variety of ant native to Australia
 Jumping jack compactor, a type of trench compactor
 Jumping Jack, a type of firework
 Jumping Jack Jones, an American baseball player in the 1880s known for his distinctive, jumping delivery
 Jumping Jacks, a 1952 Dean Martin and Jerry Lewis comedy

See also
 "Jumpin' Jack Flash", a song by The Rolling Stones
 Jumpin' Jack Flash (film)